Heveningham Hall is a Grade I listed building in Heveningham, Suffolk. The first house on the site was built for the politician and regicide William Heveningham in 1658. The present house, dating from 1778 to 1780, was designed by Sir Robert Taylor for Sir Gerald Vanneck, 2nd Baronet with interiors by James Wyatt. The hall remained in the Vanneck family until 1981.

After a period of decline and uncertainty about the future of the hall in the 20th century, it was purchased in 1994 by the billionaire property entrepreneur Jon Hunt. Various events are now held in the grounds each year, and parts of the grounds are integrated into the adjacent  Wilderness Reserve, also owned by Hunt.

History

The first house on the site was built for William Heveningham in 1658 and it stood for about 60 years before being rebuilt by John Bence in 1714. Dutch-born banker Joshua Vanneck bought the estate in 1752 and acquired more land. Vanneck's son Gerard Vanneck inherited the estate in 1777 and immediately commissioned Robert Taylor to rebuild the house again with further work to complete the East Wing from James Wyatt. Capability Brown produced designs for the gardens in 1782, but died before they could be implemented and only a few elements were constructed at the time. During the 19th century some of the gardens were remodelled, but the house remained largely unchanged. The estate remained in the hands of the Vanneck family until shortly after the death of William Vanneck, 5th Baron Huntingfield; however, the house fell into disrepair during the first half of the 20th century and was further damaged by a fire in the dining room in 1947.

On inheriting the property, Margite Wheeler offered the Hall to the nation in 1965. It was acquired in 1969 by English Heritage and was repaired and sold in 1977 (or 1981) without the contents, which remained in the English Heritage collection. It was bought by Abdul Amir Al-Ghazzi, an Iraqi businessman, via a Swiss-registered company with conditions that certain works would be carried out on the property. A few years later the building suffered another major fire which gutted East Wing and questions were asked in the House of Lords in 1987 about the state of the building and when it would be open to the public. A 1991 debate in the House of Lords noted the deterioration of the hall, with one speaker describing it as being in 'a deplorable state', with concerns also being raised about the current ownership being impossible to determine due to use of bearer shares and that it was therefore impossible to verify whether renovations that were a condition of the 1981 sale were carried out. Following the death of Al-Ghazzi in 1991, the estate was left in the hands of the receiver. Questions were again asked in the House of Lords about the hall and the terms of the 1981 sale.

After being on the market for 3 years, the hall and grounds were bought in 1994 by current owner and Foxtons founder Jon Hunt and his wife for use as a family home. By 2003 it was reported that Hunt had spent £1m on renovations to the hall.
Since the 1990s the Hunts have also returned  of the grounds using Capability Brown's original – but never implemented – designs, working with the noted English landscape architect Kim Wilkie. Restoring Brown's vision required Wilkie and Hunt to remove modern features inconsistent with an 18th-century design. Numerous concrete roads, car parks, telegraph poles and farm outbuildings were either demolished or buried. Hunt has purchased additional land around the hall, including the 4,500 estate of Sibton Park, and is developing the whole area as Wilderness Reserve, which combines high-end holiday accommodation in a number of buildings with the rewilding of much of the land.

The estate
The estate features an orangery, which is Grade I listed in its own right, as well as a Grade II* listed temple.

The main entrance gates to the estate feature two lodges with pyramid roofs which are also Grade II* listed and are connected to the main house by an underground passage.

Events

The hall hosts an annual motorsport and classic car event, the Heveningham Hall Concours d'Elegance. The hall is also the location of the annual Heveningham Hall Country Fair, which raises money for local charity causes through the Heveningham Hall Country Fair Trust.

References

External links 

 Heveningham Hall Country Fair

Country houses in Suffolk
Grade I listed buildings in Suffolk
Gardens by Capability Brown
Robert Taylor buildings